The Rock and Roll Over Tour was a concert tour by the American heavy metal group Kiss. It began November 24, 1976 (shortly after the release of the Rock and Roll Over album) and ended April 4, 1977.

History 
On February 18, 1977, the band performed for the first time at Madison Square Garden – a venue all four members had long dreamed of playing. That night was also the Garden debut of opening act Sammy Hagar.

Kiss also performed in Japan for the first time on this tour. They played Budokan Hall four nights in a row, breaking an attendance record set by The Beatles. On December 12, 1976, Ace Frehley suffered a severe electrical shock on stage. The consequent delay lasted about fifteen minutes but Frehley resumed the show, despite having lost feeling in one of his hands. Inspired by the event, he wrote "Shock Me", which appeared on Kiss' next album, 1977's Love Gun. It is the first Kiss song on which he sings lead vocals.

This was the first tour on which "Beth" was performed. Instead of being played by the band, it was sung by drummer Peter Criss to a recording of the instrumental track from the Destroyer album.

In the tour program for the band's final tour, Stanley reflected on the tour:

Setlist 

Typical setlist
 "Detroit Rock City"
 "Take Me"
 "Let Me Go, Rock 'n' Roll"
 "Ladies Room"
 "Firehouse"
 "Makin' Love"
 "I Want You"
 "Cold Gin"
 "Do You Love Me?"
 "Nothin' to Lose"
 "God of Thunder"
 "Rock and Roll All Nite"
Encore
 "Shout It Out Loud"   
 "Beth"                                                     
 "Black Diamond"

Early Tour Set list
 "Detroit Rock City"
 "Take Me"
 "Let Me Go, Rock 'n' Roll"
 "Deuce"
 "Firehouse"
 "Makin' Love"
 "Cold Gin"
 "Do You Love Me?"
 "Nothin' to Lose"
 "God of Thunder"
 "I Want You"
 "Rock and Roll All Nite"
Encore
 "Calling Dr. Love"
 "Beth"
 "Black Diamond"

"Hard Luck Woman" was played on the tour in the months of November and December 1976. Also, in the opening weeks of the tour, "Deuce" was played rather than "Ladies Room" and "Calling Dr. Love" was played instead of "Shout It Out Loud". Other songs played included "Strutter" and "Flaming Youth".

Tour dates 

 
 Ace Frehley was nearly electrocuted resulting to a 30-minute delay
Kiss performed two shows on this day, one at 3pm and one at 7pm.

Box office score data

Personnel
Paul Stanley – vocals, rhythm guitar
Gene Simmons – vocals, bass
Peter Criss – drums, vocals
Ace Frehley – lead guitar, backing vocals

References

Bibliography 

1976 concert tours
1977 concert tours
Kiss (band) concert tours